This is a list of Valparaiso Crusaders players in the NFL Draft.

Key

Selections

References

Lists of National Football League draftees by college football team

Valparaiso Beacons NFL Draft